In 1989 there were eight special elections to the United States House of Representatives.

List of elections 

Elections are listed by date and district.

|-
| 
| William F. Nichols
|  | Democratic
| 1966
|  | Incumbent died December 13, 1988.New member elected April 4, 1989.Democratic hold.
| nowrap | 

|-
| 
| Dan Coats
|  | Republican
| 1980
|  |Incumbent resigned January 3, 1989, to become U.S. Senator.New member elected March 28, 1989.Democratic gain.
| nowrap | 

|-
| 
| Dick Cheney
|  | Republican
| 1978
|  | Incumbent resigned March 17, 1989, to become U.S. Secretary of Defense.New member elected April 26, 1989.Republican hold.
| nowrap | 

|-
| 
| Claude Pepper
|  | Democratic
| 1962
|  | Incumbent died May 30, 1989.New member elected August 29, 1989.Republican gain.
| nowrap | 

|-
| 
| Tony Coelho
|  | Democratic
| 1978
|  | Incumbent resigned June 15, 1989.New member elected September 12, 1989.Democratic hold.
| nowrap | 

|-
| 
| Jim Wright
|  | Democratic
| 1954
|  | Incumbent resigned June 30, 1989.New member elected September 12, 1989.Democratic hold.
| nowrap | 

|-
| 
| Mickey Leland
|  | Democratic
| 1978
|  | Incumbent died August 7, 1989.New member elected December 9, 1989.Democratic hold.
| nowrap | 

|-
| 
| Larkin I. Smith
|  | Republican
| 1988
|  | Incumbent died August 13, 1989.New member elected October 17, 1989.Democratic gain.
| nowrap | 

|}

See also 
 List of special elections to the United States House of Representatives
 101st United States Congress

References 

 
1989